Kočevska Reka is a settlement in the Municipality of Kočevje in southern Slovenia. It was a village settled by Gottschee Germans. A major fire destroyed most of the village in 1929, but it was restored. During the Second World War its original population was expelled. The area is part of the traditional region of Lower Carniola and is now included in the Southeast Slovenia Statistical Region.

Name
The settlement was originally called Reka (literally, 'river'), after the Reka River south of the settlement. The specifier Kočevska 'Kočevje' was added later in order to distinguish the settlement from the town of Rijeka on the Kvarner Gulf, with which the population had trade connections.

History
The Kočevska Reka volunteer fire department became a founding unit of the Kočevje municipal fire department on 28 August 1955.

Church
The local parish church, dedicated to John the Baptist, was a 16th-century building that survived the Second World War, but it was demolished in 1954. The current church was built between 1994 and 1999.

Notable people
Notable people that were born or lived in Kočevska Reka include:
Johann Kosler (1819–1898), politician and agriculture expert
Josef Kosler (1822–1917), lawyer and head of efforts to drain the Ljubljana Marsh

Gallery

References

External links

Kočevska Reka on Geopedia
Pre–World War II map of Kočevska Reka with oeconyms and family names

Populated places in the Municipality of Kočevje